The Decembrist revolution was a military coup in the Buenos Aires Province, Argentina. Juan Lavalle, returning with the troops that fought in the Argentine-Brazilian War, performed a coup on December 1, 1828, capturing and killing the governor Manuel Dorrego and ultimately closing the legislature. The rancher Juan Manuel de Rosas organized militias that fought against Lavalle and removed him from power, restoring the legislature. However, as the coup had reignited the Argentine Civil Wars, Rosas was appointed governor of the Buenos Aires province to wage the war against the Unitarian League. José María Paz made from Córdoba a league of provinces, and so did Rosas. The conflict ended a short time after the unexpected capture of Paz, who mistook enemy troops for his own.

Context
The Argentine Civil Wars began during the Argentine War of Independence. The conflict was between the federals, who wanted to organize the country as a federation, and the Unitarians, who preferred a centralist government with capital in Buenos Aires. The last military conflict was the 1820 battle of Cepeda; since then a new constituent assembly was convened to write a new constitution and organize the country. The provinces rejected the 1826 constitution because of its centralist tendencies, and the unitarian president Bernardino Rivadavia resigned. The provinces became a confederation once more, and federal Manuel Dorrego was appointed governor of Buenos Aires.

The Banda Oriental had been conquered and annexed by Portugal, which renamed it as Cisplatina; the Portuguese colonies in South America declared their independence and became the Empire of Brazil shortly after. Both countries began the Argentine-Brazilian War for the control of the province. The peace treaty declared it an independent country, the modern nation of Uruguay, which was disliked by the Argentine military that fought in the conflict.

Coup

General Juan Lavalle was initially neither federalist nor unitarian, but after his return he began to be influenced by the unitarians, who tried to gain him for their side. The bulk of the army arrived to Buenos Aires on November 26, being in a bad shape: they lacked clothing and food, they had unpaid wages since months ago, and resented the peace treaty. There were rumors in the city that the army would revolt against the governor Dorrego, but he dismissed those rumors. The leaders of the revolution met on December 1 to organize the coup, and Dorrego began to reconsider it. But according to the memoirs of Tomás de Iriarte, the minister Tomás Guido prevented the government from organizing a proper resistance. Lavalle's forces gathered in La Recoleta, and began to march at 3:30 in the morning, once he got the horses for the cavalry. The admiral William Brown supported the operation and prepared a naval siege of the Fort (modern Casa Rosada), but it was not needed. Lacking any means of defense, Dorrego escaped to the countryside. A group of soldiers occupied the Buenos Aires Cabildo and another secured the police. It was unclear if the Fort would begin a resistance, but once the departure of Dorrego was known, the revolutionaries claimed victory and played a military march.

The disputes between the revolutionaries began immediately: Lavalle had promised to be just the military leader of the operation, but now he intended to be appointed governor. A voting organized in the Cabildo by the military, attended only by supporters of the coup, proclaimed Lavalle interim governor, and the military forces in the Fort gave up the resistance at 13:00, accepting Lavalle's rule. The Hall of Representatives, the legislature of Buenos Aires, was closed.

There was no active resistance in the city. Lacking leadership, several groups of federals left the city and sought the help of the rancher Juan Manuel de Rosas to organize the resistance against the coup. According to Iriarte's memoirs, Lavalle was informed that all the countryside was against the coup, so he appointed William Brown interim governor and left the city with 600 cuirassiers. Dorrego met with Rosas on December 6, and the unitarian Gregorio Aráoz de Lamadrid met them a pair of days later, proposing peace negotiations. According to Lamadrid's memoirs, Rosas initially rejected the proposal, considering Lavalle an outlaw, but finally agreed to send delegates to negotiate.

Rosas and Dorrego did not agree on the military movements. Dorrego wanted to head the forces to battle against the unitarians, and Rosas preferred to avoid a battle at the moment, and retreat to the Santa Fe province to request support from the federal governor Estanislao López and wait for the dispersed militias of the countryside to join them. Without an agreement, they divided their forces and headed each one to each destination. Dorrego was defeated at the battle of Navarro, and then betrayed by his officers Bernardino Escribano and Mariano Acha, who defected from the federals to the unitarians and took him prisoner to Lavalle.

Dorrego was not sent to Buenos Aires for a trial. The unitarians Juan Cruz Varela and Salvador María del Carril wrote mails to Lavalle instructing him to execute Dorrego. Varela requested him to destroy the mails after reading them, but Lavalle kept them. Dorrego was executed in Navarro on December 13, 1828.

The execution of Dorrego generated a huge controversy in Buenos Aires. Varela wrote a new mail to Lavalle, instructing him to forge documents to make things seem as if he had conducted a trial in Navarro, but Lavalle kept this mail as well. The federals saw Dorrego as a martyr and increased their rejection for the military government. The National Convention in Santa Fe (the highest national authority at the time) rejected the coup and the execution of Dorrego as crimes of high treason against the state, and appointed Estanislao López the leader of the troops that would be sent to remove the government in Buenos Aires. The provinces of Córdoba and Entre Ríos joined the offensive, and then the others. The government in Buenos Aires began a campaign of political repression against all federals. Lavalle was soon reinforced by general José María Paz . The number of deaths caused by the political repression was so high that in 1829 Buenos Aires had a higher number of deaths than births.

José de San Martín returned from Europe at this time. When he knew of the resignation of his political enemy Rivadavia he sailed back to Buenos Aires, to take part in the war against Brazil. The end of the conflict, the Decembrist  revolution and the execution of Dorrego took place during his journey: once in Buenos Aires, he disliked the ongoing conflicts and did not leave the ship. Lavalle proposed him to be the new governor of Buenos Aires, but he refused to take part in a civil war, and returned to Europe.

Lavalle and Paz move their armies to Santa Fe and Córdoba each one. López managed to force Lavalle to send his troops to a region rich in mío mío, a toxic grass: five hundred horses died, half of his cavalry. Lavalle attempted to return to Buenos Aires, and met Rosas and López at the battle of Márquez Bridge, where he was defeated. López returned to Santa Fe, because Paz had successfully conquered Córdoba and feared that his province may be next. Completely defeated, Lavalle headed unescorted to Rosas’ base of operations and requested to parley with him. It was late and Rosas was not there at the time, so he was allowed to sleep at Rosas’ bedroom. When he woke up, Rosas was next to his bed and invited him with a mate. Lavalle, regretful of the execution of Dorrego, agreed to step down from power. They signed the Cañuelas Pact, calling for elections of members of a new legislature. Lavalle would stay as governor during the transition. They proposed an unified ballot, with both federal and unitarian candidates.

The unitarians did not accept the pact: they rejected the action of Lavalle and proposed a new ballot instead, composed entirely of unitarians, and attempted to impose it with electoral fraud. Lavalle, in turn, rejected the unitarians that defied the pact, and called them “enemies of peace" in a mail to Rosas. Lavalle and Rosas began to write mails to each other, in friendly terms, trying to coordinate the actions to end the conflict. Lavalle proposed to retire the most violent federal candidates of the joint ballot and replace them with moderate unitarians. Still, unitarians did not accept the proposal and imposed their own ballot. Federals prepared to renew the war, but it was not needed. To prevent further hostilities, Lavalle signed a new convention with Rosas. Instead of calling for elections to appoint a new legislature, they agreed to simply restore the old one, closed at the beginning of the decembrist revolution. Juan José Viamonte, a moderate federal, was appointed governor.

Lavalle left Buenos Aires and moved to Montevideo, Uruguay; many federals that were exiled or left the country began to return. A group of federals, including Viamonte, wanted to hold elections for a new legislature, but Rosas pointed that the terms of the deposed legislators had not ended yet and that they were not legally interrupted; his position prevailed. The legislature met on December 1, 1829, a year after the coup. But although the unitarians had been defeated in Buenos Aires, Paz was still in control of Córdoba and defeated Quiroga at the battle of La Tablada. Colonel Smith attempted to mutiny and take his unit to Córdoba, his attempt was thwarted but generated great concern in the city. The legislature voted to release the sum of public power to the governor to deal with the crisis, as it had happened with many governments in the city since 1811. A pair of days later they appointed Rosas the new definitive governor.

Government of Rosas

The state funeral of Manuel Dorrego was held soon after Rosas became governor. He faced the military threat of José María Paz, who began a campaign against federals in Córdoba similar to the one of Lavalle. His actions were not limited to the province of Córdoba, and sent Gregorio Aráoz de Lamadrid to la Rioja and Roman Deheza to Santiago del Estero. Quiroga organized a new army and fought against Paz again, suffering a second defeat at the battle of Oncativo. The provinces under the influence of Paz would become the Unitarian League, Paz would style himself the Supreme Chief of the League. In the poor provinces far away from Buenos Aires, both unitarians and federals had problems to keep up their armies. Quiroga's army was larger, Paz's army was smaller but more professional and had other types of needs. Both Paz and Rosas organize armies for the final conflict. Lavalle, Lamadrid and Martín Rodríguez attempt a coup in Entre Ríos, but they fail. Buenos Aires, Santa Fe and Entre Ríos signed a defensive and offensive alliance, the Federal pact. The Corrientes province joined it a pair of months later.

The military conflicts begin in 1831. López heads to Córdoba with 2,000 men, Felipe Ibarra returns to Santiago del Estero from Santa Fe, Ángel Pacheco leads the armies of Buenos Aires, and Quiroga moves to Cuyo (Mendoza, San Luis and San Juan). The initial conflicts prove favourable to the federals: Pacheco defeated the forces of Paz, Ibarra and Benito Villafañe liberated Santiago del Estero and Catamarca, there were local federal rebellions in Córdoba and La Rioja, and Quiroga liberated Mendoza. Still, the most unexpected event of the war was the capture of general Paz. He had dressed his soldiers as gauchos, and during a reconnaissance mission he confused the troops of López (composed by real gauchos) with his own; his horse was entangled and he was taken prisoner.

With the capture of Paz, the Unitarian League began to be defeated. López and Balcarce liberated Córdoba on June 11, and Quiroga headed to Tucumán. José Vicente Reinafé, close to Estanislao López, was appointed governor of Córdoba. All the provinces join the Federal Pact upon their liberation: first Córdoba, Santiago del Estero, La Rioja and the three provinces of Cuyo between August and October, and Catamarca, Tucumán and Salta the following year.

References

Bibliography
 
 

Campaigns of the Argentine Civil War
Military coups in Argentina
1828 in Argentina
Revolutions in Argentina
1820s coups d'état and coup attempts
1830s coups d'état and coup attempts
Revolutions during the 1820s